Victor Worsley (born April 24, 1984 in Battleboro, North Carolina) is an American football linebacker who is currently a free agent. He was originally signed by the Colts as an undrafted free agent in 2007. He played college football at North Carolina.Worsley was released during the final cuts of the 2008 season.

Early years
Victor attended North Edgecombe High School, where he was a four-year starter at linebacker and also played fullback.

External links
Indianapolis Colts bio
North Carolina Tar Heels bio

1984 births
Living people
American football linebackers
North Carolina Tar Heels football players
Indianapolis Colts players
Sportspeople from Rocky Mount, North Carolina